The Légion impériale was a military unit created by the Vichy French government in November 1942, with the support of Nazi Ambassador Otto Abetz, to oppose the Allies, who had invaded North Africa in order to drive the Axis out. In April 1943 it was renamed Légion des Volontaires Française de Tunisie (Legion of French Volunteers of Tunisia), and it went into captivity upon the Axis surrender in Africa in May.

Organization 
They were only able to raise a single weak battalion for the Legion, called the Phalange Africaine (African phalanx). It consisted of 400-450 men, about 2/3 French and 1/3 Algerians.

Commanding officers 
The battalion was commanded by Colonel Simon Petru Cristofini.

Operational history 
In the spring of 1943 it fought along with the remnants of the German 334th Infantry Division.

See also
 Operation Torch, North African Campaign
 Vichy France

External links
 Pipes, Jason. "334.Infanterie-Division". Retrieved April 4, 2005.
 Wendel, Marcus (2005). "Phalange Africaine". Retrieved April 4, 2005.

Military units and formations of France in World War II
Military units and formations established in 1942
Military of Vichy France
Collaboration with Nazi Germany